Baker Street is an area of Orsett in the unitary authority of Thurrock. It is in the ceremonial county of Essex, England. In 2019 it had an estimated population of 598.

Description 
Reaney suggests the name is derived from William Bakere de Luggestreet.

It is known locally because of the surviving windmill. The windmill is said to have been built in the 17th century and ceased working in 1911. It is now a private house.

Notes

Hamlets in Essex
Thurrock